The Parades Commission is a quasi-judicial non-departmental public body responsible for placing restrictions on any parades in Northern Ireland it deems contentious or offensive. It is composed of seven members, all of whom are appointed by the Secretary of State for Northern Ireland. Restrictions it can impose include a prohibition on music being played, re-routing parades to avoid contentious areas, or banning certain participants based on previous breaches of its determinations. Its rulings are usually enforced by either parade stewards or the police, though there are disputes as to whether this is done to the letter of the law in certain areas. The Commission acts under the Public Processions (Northern Ireland) Act 1998.

Parade organisers and participants are liable to arrest and prosecution for breaching any of the Commission's rulings, although no-one has been charged since the Commission was established in 1998. A section 6(7) offence has a maximum punishment of six months imprisonment or level five on the standard scale.

The Commission was set up after the large-scale civil strife that followed the Drumcree conflict over an Orange Order parade in Portadown. It has come under strong criticism from the Order. The Grand Lodge of the Order has a policy of non-engagement with the Commission, although some private and district lodges, particularly those with contentious parades, have agreed to talk to it.

Commissioners
As of April 2021, the Commissioners are:

Graham Forbes (Chair)
Joelle Black BL
Derek Wilson
Marian Cree
Eimear McAllister
Billy Gamble

See also

List of Government departments and agencies in Northern Ireland

References

External links 
 

Quasi-judicial bodies
Orange Order
The Troubles (Northern Ireland)
Northern Ireland peace process
1998 establishments in Northern Ireland
Northern Ireland Office
Non-departmental public bodies of the United Kingdom government
Organizations established in 1998
Freedom of assembly